Meast is an album by Mike Paradinas released in 2004 under his moniker "Kid Spatula." It compiles a selection of previously unreleased tracks written between 1994 and 1998, spanning two discs.

Track listing
Disc 1: 
 "Housewife" 3:55
 "Shistner's Bassflex" 3:01
 "Spacious Hallway" 2:16
 "Further 2" 4:36
 "Tugboat" 5:58
 "P.V." 1:29
 "Local Jogger" 3:40
 "Harpsichord" 2:10
 "Trike" 4:09
 "Residue" 1:40
 "Carrier" 4:42
 "Disclosed" 5:59
 "Jackal" 4:40
 "It Starts With Bongos" 4:48
 "Squirms" 5:26
 "Bobby" 6:00
 "Grandwash" 5:24

Disc 2: 
 "Sad & Solid" 5:33
 "Off Lemon" 3:18
 "Orange Crumble" 4:08
 "Detlev Bronk" 3:10
 "Upton" 3:28
 "Weiro" 4:55
 "Peg" 4:46
 "Lesque" 2:40
 "Mocaseg" 6:27
 "Go Ya Lo" 4:56
 "Measty" 3:28
 "Member" 4:48
 "Mighty Softstep" 2:39
 "My Piano & Me" 4:44
 "Round &" 1:23
 "Buttress" 4:18
 "Broccoli" 5:16

Recorded in Somerset Avenue 1994: 2-01
Recorded in Merton High Street 1995: 1-12
Recorded in Strone Road 1996: 1-17, 2-02, 2-04, 2-09
Recorded in Albert Road 1997: 1-02, 1-03, 1-04, 1-06, 1-09, 1-14, 1-16, 2-03, 2-05, 2-06, 2-07, 2-10, 2-11, 2-13, 2-14
Recorded in Albert Road 1998: 1-01, 1-05, 1-07, 1-08, 1-10, 1-11, 1-13, 1-15, 2-08, 2-15, 2-16, 2-17
No date is listed for track 2-12.

References

Mike Paradinas albums
2004 albums
Planet Mu albums